Namtok (also known as Nantok) is a village and a former Shan state in the Myelat region of what is today Burma. It was small, having an area of only . Today it is located in Langhko Township in Langhko District just to the northeast of Langhko town.

References

External links
Maplandia World Gazetteer

Populated places in Langhko District
Langhko Township